Nationality words link to articles with information on the nation's poetry or literature (for instance, Irish or France).

Events

Works published

Births
Death years link to the corresponding "[year] in poetry" article:
 February 23 – Salima Sultan Begum (Makhfi) (died 1613), Mughal empress consort and Urdu poet
 November – Jacques Grévin born about this year (died 1570), French playwright and poet
 Paulus Schede Melissus (died 1602), German

Deaths
Birth years link to the corresponding "[year] in poetry" article:

See also

 Poetry
 16th century in poetry
 16th century in literature
 French Renaissance literature
 Renaissance literature
 Spanish Renaissance literature

Notes

16th-century poetry
Poetry